This is a list of Swiss football transfers for the 2015 summer transfer window. Only moves featuring Swiss Super League or Swiss Challenge League are listed.

Swiss Super League

FC Basel

In:

Out:

Grasshopper Club Zürich

In:

Out:

FC Lugano

In:

Out:

FC Luzern

In:

Out:

FC Sion

In:

Out:

FC St. Gallen

In:

Out:

FC Thun

In:

Out:

FC Vaduz

In:

Out:

BSC Young Boys

In:

Out:

FC Zürich

In:

Out:

Swiss Challenge League

FC Aarau

In:

Out:

FC Biel-Bienne

In:

Out:

FC Chiasso

In:

Out:

FC Lausanne-Sport

In:

Out:

FC Le Mont

In:

Out:

Neuchâtel Xamax

In:

Out:

FC Schaffhausen

In:

Out:

FC Wil

In:

Out:

FC Winterthur

In:

Out:

FC Wohlen

In:

Out:

References

Transfers
Switzerland
2015